The 2002 Bulgarian Figure Skating Championships was held in Sofia between December 11 and 13, 2001. Skaters competed in the disciplines of men's singles, ladies' singles, and ice dancing on the senior level.

The results were used to choose the teams to the 2002 Winter Olympics, the 2002 World Championships, and the 2002 European Championships.

Results

Men

Ladies

Pairs

Ice dancing

* Ina Demireva / Tsvetan Georgiev were the junior national champions and only competitors, and the ISU recognizes them as the senior silver medalists.

External links
 results

2001 in figure skating
Bulgarian Figure Skating Championships, 2002
2001 in Bulgarian sport
Bulgarian Figure Skating Championships, 2002